Matheus Sampaio Correa (born September 23, 1999), better known by his stage name MC Pikachu, is a Brazilian rapper. Named after the Pokémon, MC Pikachu was born in Suzano neighborhood, located in the East Zone of São Paulo and joined the boldness funk career in 2014, at age 15, through participation in the music video for his cousin MC Bin Laden. The singer had his first fame with the single "Feliz Natal", featuring MC Bin Laden and MC 2k.

MC Pikachu caused controversy because of the explicitly pornographic lyrics in some songs, most notably in the song "Tava na Rua", where he also made references to illicit drugs, because the singer was underage, getting to be prevented from doing shows.

References 

1999 births
21st-century Brazilian male singers
21st-century Brazilian singers
Brazilian child singers
Funk carioca musicians
Obscenity controversies in music
Living people